Patty Fendick and Meredith McGrath were the defending champions but only Fendick competed that year with Lisa Raymond.

Fendick and Raymond lost in the semifinals to Katrina Adams and Brenda Schultz.

Nicole Arendt and Laura Golarsa won in the final 6–4, 6–3 against Adams and Schultz.

Seeds
Champion seeds are indicated in bold text while text in italics indicates the round in which those seeds were eliminated.

 Patty Fendick /  Lisa Raymond (semifinals)
 Nicole Arendt /  Laura Golarsa (champions)
 Katrina Adams /  Brenda Schultz (final)
 Amanda Coetzer /  Elna Reinach (first round)

Draw

External links
 1995 IGA Classic Doubles Draw

U.S. National Indoor Championships
1995 WTA Tour